Robert von Pöhlmann (31 October 1852 in Nuremberg – 27 September 1914 in Munich) was a German ancient historian.

From 1870 to 1874 he studied classical philology and history at the universities of Munich, Göttingen and Leipzig. While a student his influences included Georg Waitz at Gottingen and Wilhelm Roscher at Leipzig University. In 1884 he became an associate professor at the University of Erlangen, where in 1886 he attained a full professorship. From 1901 onward, he was a professor of ancient history at the University of Munich.

Literary works 
 Die Uebervölkerung der antiken Großstädte, 1884 – The overpopulation of ancient cities.
 Grundriss der griechischen Geschichte, 1909 – Outline of Greek history.
 Geschichte des antiken Kommunismus und Sozialismus, 2 volumes, 1893-1901 – History of ancient communism and socialism.
 Geschichte der sozialen Frage und des Sozialismus in der antiken Welt, 2 volumes, 1912 – History of social issues and of socialism in the ancient world.
He was responsible for editions 22–24 of Roscher's Grundlagen der Nationalökonomie.

References

External links 
 Complete German text of Pöhlmanns's Geschichte der sozialen Frage

1852 births
1914 deaths
19th-century German historians
German untitled nobility
Academic staff of the University of Erlangen-Nuremberg
Academic staff of the Ludwig Maximilian University of Munich
20th-century German historians
19th-century German male writers
19th-century German writers
German male non-fiction writers